School of Life may refer to:
 School of Life, a 2017 French adventure film
 School of Life, a 2005 television drama
 School of Life (2003 film), a 2003 comedy
 Life School, a charter school in Lancaster, Texas, USA
 The School of Life, a UK-based global organisation which teaches "emotional skills"

See also
 School of Hard Knocks (disambiguation)